Frelsburg is an unincorporated community in Colorado County, Texas, United States. It lies at the intersection of Farm to Market Road 109 and Farm to Market Road 1291. The community was founded around 1837 by immigrants from Germany. It is home to one of the oldest surviving general stores in Texas. Continuously operated since 1865 and owned by the Heinsohn family since 1920, the store is called Heinsohn's Country Store.

Geography
Frelsburg is located at the intersection of FM 109 and FM 1291 in the northern corner of Colorado County. It is between New Ulm on the east and Fayetteville on the west.

History
Captain William Frels and his brother John founded Frelsburg around 1837. The brothers emigrated from Germany to Texas in 1834 on the ship Congress. William Frels served in the Texian Army and donated the land for the town, school, and the Protestant church, cemetery, and parsonage. Germans from the regions of Holstein and Oldenburg settled Frelsburg so that the community merited a post office in 1847. More Germans from the Rhineland arrived and established Saints Peter and Paul Catholic Church. By 1852, the community included general stores, a cotton gin, blacksmiths, harness-makers, and small farms. After the American Civil War, cotton farming became the predominant use of agricultural land, thanks to the efforts of Frank Walls, sr. who invented an automatic distributor and cleaner for cotton gins.

In 1870, an attempt to open Hermann University failed and the building was sold to the local school district instead. During the 1870s, the Galveston, Harrisburg and San Antonio Railroad passed through Columbus,  to the south of Frelsburg and the Missouri–Kansas–Texas Railroad passed to the north. Despite missing the railroads, Frelsburg had one sawmill, three churches, four gristmills, five cotton gins, and a population of 300 in 1884. The post office closed in 1908. By the 1950s, land use changed from small farms to cattle ranching. Discovery of the Frelsburg gas field took some land out of agricultural production. From 1933 to 2000, the population of Frelsburg was reported to be 75.

Businesses and churches

Notes

References

Further reading
 Rudolph L. Biesele, Rudolph L. (1930). The History of the German Settlements in Texas, 1831-1861, Austin: Von Boeckmann-Jones.
 Frelsburg Historical Committee (1986).  The History of Frelsburg, New Ulm, Texas: Enterprise.
 Schmidt, C.W. (1930). Footprints of Five Generations, New Ulm, Texas: New Ulm Enterprise.

Unincorporated communities in Colorado County, Texas
Unincorporated communities in Texas